The Aggrovators were a dub/reggae backing band in the 1970s and 1980s, and one of the main session bands of producer Bunny Lee. The line-up varied, with Lee using the name for whichever set of musicians he was using at any time. The band's name derived from the record shop that Lee had run in the late 1960s, Agro Sounds. Alumni of the band included many musicians who later went on to make names for themselves in reggae music. Legends such as Jackie Mittoo, Sly and Robbie, Tommy McCook, and Aston Barrett were all involved with the band at one point or another. Other regular members included Carlton "Santa" Davis, Earl "Chinna" Smith, George "Fully" Fullwood, Ansel Collins, Bernard "Touter" Harvey, Tony Chin, Bobby Ellis, and Vin Gordon. The band recorded Lee's most popular output from the 1970s, with the instrumental B-sides of Lee's single releases on the Jackpot and Justice labels generally credited to The Aggrovators and mixed by King Tubby.

Discography

Albums
 1975 - Shalom Dub (King Tubby & The Aggrovators)
 1975 - Brass Rockers (Tommy McCook & The Aggravators)
 1975 - Cookin (Tommy McCook & The Aggrovators)
 1975 - King Tubby Meets The Aggrovators At Dub Station (Tommy McCook & The Aggrovators)
 1975 - Show Case (Tommy McCook & The Aggrovators)
 1976 - Rasta Dub 76
 1976 - Reggae Stones Dub
 1977 - Kaya Dub
 1977 - Aggrovators Meets The Revolutioners At Channel One Studios
 1977 - Disco Rockers (Tommy McCook & The Aggrovators) (aka Hot Lava)
 1978 - Guerilla Dub (The Aggrovators & The Revolutionaries)
 1978 - Jammies In Lion Dub Style
 1979 - Rockers Almighty Dub (The Aggrovators & The Revolutionaries)
 197X - Presents Super Dub Disco Style (Bunny Lee & The Aggrovators)
 1982 - Dubbing In The Back Yard (King Tubby & The Aggrovators)
 1983 - Scientist Presents Neville Brown With The Aggrovators At Channel One
1990 - King Tubby's "Controls"
2007 - @ King Tubby's Studio 
2017 - Aggrovating The Rhythm At Channel One - Rare Dubs 1976-1979

Compilations
 1975-77 - Bionic Dub (The Aggrovators & King Tubby & Bunny Lee)
 197X - Bunny Lee Meets King Tubby & Aggrovators
 1973-77 - Creation Dub (The Aggrovators & King Tubby)
 1974-76 - Dub Jackpot (The Aggrovators & King Tubby)
 1975-76 - Dub Justice
 1975-79 - Dub Gone Crazy (The Aggrovators & King Tubby)
 1973-78 - Dubbing It Studio 1 Style
 1975-77 - Foundation Of Dub (King Tubby & The Aggrovators)
 197X - Instrumental Reggae (The Aggrovators featuring Bobby Ellis & Tommy McCook)
 1975-76 - Johnny In The Echo Chamber
 1973-77 - Straight To I Roy Head (Bunny Lee & King Tubby & The Aggrovators)
 2005 - The Rough Guide to Dub (Various artists, World Music Network)

References

External links
Biography on record label's website
Partial discography on Roots Archives
Discography at Discogs

1970s establishments in Jamaica
1980s disestablishments in Jamaica
Jamaican reggae musical groups
Jamaican backing bands
Musical groups established in the 1970s
Musical groups disestablished in the 1980s